AUHSD may refer to:

Anaheim Union High School District, a public school district in Orange County, California
Acalanes Union High School District, a public school district in Contra Costa County, California